Viktor Isajloski (born September 28, 2001) is a Macedonian professional basketball Forward who plays for MZT Skopje 2.

Professional career
On July 19, 2018, he signed his first contract with MZT Skopje.

References

External links
 

2001 births
Living people
Macedonian men's basketball players
Small forwards
KK MZT Skopje players